The 2021 Liga 3 Bali season (also known as the 2021 Bali United Liga 3 season for sponsorship reasons) was the sixth season of Liga 3 Bali as a qualifying round for the national round of the 2021–22 Liga 3. It began on 14 October and ended with a final on 15 December 2021. Perseden were the defending champion and they successfully defended their title following a 1–0 win against PS Jembrana in the final.

Teams
There were 16 teams participated in the league this season.

First round
In this round, competing teams were divided into four groups of four teams (groups A to D). Teams in each group played one another in a round-robin, with the top two teams advanced to the second round.

All times listed below are Central Indonesia Time (WITA).

Group A

Group B

Group C

Group D

Second round
In this round, competing teams were divided into two groups of four teams (groups X to Y). Teams in each group played one another in a round-robin, with the top two teams advanced to the knockout stage.

All times listed below are Central Indonesia Time (WITA).

Group X

Group Y

Knockout stage

Bracket

Semi-finals

Third place play-off

Final

Top goalscorers

References

Liga 3
Sport in Bali